The 1934 United States Senate election in Connecticut was held on November 6, 1934. Incumbent Republican Senator Frederic C. Walcott ran for re-election to a second term, but was defeated by Democratic U.S. Representative Francis T. Maloney.

General election

Candidates
Devere Allen, activist and editor of The World Tomorrow (Socialist)
Donald H. Loomis (Communist)
Francis T. Maloney, U.S. Representative from Meriden (Democratic)
Alfred Morley (Independent Citizens)
Frederic C. Walcott, incumbent Senator since 1929 (Republican)

Results

References

Connecticut
1934
1934 Connecticut elections